Killarney station could refer to:

 Killarney Station, a pastoral lease in Australia
 Killarney station (PAAC), a light rail station in Pittsburgh, Pennsylvania
 Killarney railway station, a railway station in Killarney, Ireland